"Dil Se Jaan Laga De" was the official anthem of the 2018 Pakistan Super League, the third season of the Pakistan Super League. It has been written, composed and sung by Ali Zafar under his Lightingale Studios, and was released on 28 January by Silent Roar Productions and HBL Pakistan.

Background
Through his tweet, Zafar hinted the new song for the league on 18 December 2017, when previous "Ab Khel Jamay Ga" reached 6 million views on YouTube. The anthem was officially announced by a promotion hashtag #DilSeJaanLagaDe on 28 December. The Nation reported that he is "extremely fortunate to live these two passions" that "lie at the heart of our nation's DNA"; "cricket and music". "As exciting as it is to write, compose and to sing PSL's official anthem for the third time, it was actually quite challenging given that last year's anthem was such a massive hit," said Zafar. "The most important thing is to bring in the spirit", he said to Something Haute, "Spirit not just of the game, but the nation that's going to be following it."

In an official interview, Zafar shared his personal thought process of song creativity, "For "Ab Khel Ke Dikha", first year was more introductory, for something that was coming. Next year, for "Ab Khel Jamay Ga", there was a vision, there was a hope, there was a dream. This year, we have to move a step forward, and to me, this year is for celebration that a huge dream has been achieved. It's time of celebration on fulfillment of that dream, and I vision to create a huge chorus, that people sing in stadium, and that they remember."

Release and music video
The video shoot was confirmed by Junaid Khan on 22 December. The anthem was released on 28 January 2018 by HBL Pakistan, the same day when Pakistani cricket team was ranked at top position in ICC T20I Championship. Music video features Pakistani cricketers, including Khan, Shahid Afridi, Misbah-ul-Haq, Umar Gul, Fakhar Zaman, Umar Amin, Babar Azam, Rumman Raees, Usman Shinwari, Faheem Ashraf and Amad Butt getting ready for the pitch. It can also be seen in the video that Rameez Raja is drumming, Shoaib Malik is boxing and Ahmed Shehzad is playing guitars.

The melody of this anthem was also played at the end of opening ceremony of 2019 Pakistan Super League.

Reception
DAWN Images said, "another tune we think we're going to have on repeat". The Express Tribune referred Zafar and his anthems as "voice and soul" of the league respectively. Shahjehan Saleem of Something Haute said, "the anthem serves as the perfect amuse bouche". Ramsha Soofi of Daily Pakistan said, "it's magic", that "takes you right into the golden days of country's cricket." Asfia Afzal of Business Recorder said that "Zafar recreates magic in" the anthem. Geo News criticized the absence of national cricket team captain Sarfraz Ahmed from the video. Saira Khan of HIP commented, "the song succeeds in getting you rooting for your favorite teams." Kayenat Kalam of VeryFilmi said, "this song will give you goosebumps!" Darakhshan Anjum of RS-Tech said that "It seems that" Zafar "has begun this" anthem "from where he left the last one", as it has "left the public mesmerized." Maheen Sabeeh of The News International said that it has "a big, incredibly catchy sing-along chorus" and most impressive thing is that it "doesn't encourage aggression". M. Hussain of The Express Tribune commented that "it is a good enough song" but "not too impressive. Partly because it resembles a certain Coldplay song" and "it's almost repetitive" as the previous ones.

See also

List of Pakistan Super League anthems
Ali Zafar discography

References

2018 Pakistan Super League
2018
2018 songs
Ali Zafar songs